Jinxi is a town under the administration of Taihu County in Anqing, Anhui, China. , it has 8 residential communities and 14 villages under its administration.

References 

Township-level divisions of Anhui
Taihu County